Bhavin Jitendra Thakkar (born 22 January 1982, in Mumbai, Maharashtra) is an Indian cricketer.

Thakkar last played a first-class game in 2010 for Himachal Pradesh. He has played 37 first-class games in all scoring 1924 runs at 35.62, with five tons and 10 fifties. Before Himachal, Thakkar had played for Mumbai.
He signs for Jharkhand in the 2013/14 season.

References

External links
  from Cricinfo

1982 births
Living people
Cricketers from Mumbai
Indian cricketers
Mumbai cricketers
Himachal Pradesh cricketers